The Order of Merit of the Republic of Turkey is awarded by the President of Turkey upon the proposal of the relevant members of the Cabinet considering the opinions of the Ministry of Foreign Affairs and the Atatürk Supreme Council for Culture, Language and History.

The order is awarded to foreign scientists, academics, artists and intellectuals in recognition of their contributions to international promotion and celebration of the Republic of Turkey in science and arts.

Recipients of the Order of Merit
 8 June 1990 –  : Joseph Jacob Heinotten
 8 June 1990 –  : Clemens Holzmeister
 25 October 1996 –  : Rupert Wilbrandt
 25 October 1996 –  : Wilhelm Leitner
 25 October 1996 –  : Annemarie Schimmel
 28 August 1997 –  : Geza Feher
 28 August 1997 –  : Gerö Gyözü
 28 August 1997 –  : Geza David
 20 November 1997 –  : Ninette de Valois
 14 January 1998 –  : Jean-Paul Roux
 14 January 1998 –  : Robert Mantran
 14 January 1998 –  : Yuzo Nagata
 14 January 1998 –  : Shoichiro Toyoda
 14 January 1998 –  : Isao Yonekura
 14 January 1998 –  : Kamil Veli Nerimanoğlu
 14 January 1998 –  : Tofig Ismayilov
 14 January 1998 –  : Justin McCarthy
 14 January 1998 –  : Stanford Shaw
 14 January 1998 –  : Bernard Lewis
 14 January 1998 –  : Andrew Mango
 14 January 1998 –  : Geoffrey Lewis
 14 January 1998 –  : Omeljan Pritsak
 14 January 1998 –  : Roziya Galiyevna Mukminova
 14 January 1998 –  : Bubina Oruzbayeva
 14 January 1998 –  : Edhem Tenişev
 14 January 1998 –  : Gubeydolla Aydarov
 13 February 1998 –  : Bert G. Fragner
 13 February 1998 –  : Oraz Yağmur
 14 February 1998 –  : André Clot
 5 October 1998 –  : Augusto Sinegra
 9 October 1998 –  : Patrick Kinross
 9 October 1998 –  : Nasrullah Mübeşşir el-Tırazi
 9 October 1998 –  : Hüseyin Mucib el-Mısri
 1 January 1999 –  : Abdimalik Nisanbayev
 4 January 1999 –  : İbrahim El-Mouelhy
 3 June 2008 –  : Sachihiro Omura
 20 October 2008 –  : Lars Johanson
 20 October 2008 –  : András Róna-Tas
 20 October 2008 –  : Robert Dancoff
 20 October 2008 –  : Walter G. Andrews
 20 October 2008 –  : Viktor Guzev
 11 June 2014 –  : Evangelia Balta
 11 June 2014 –  : Suraiya Faroqhi
 11 June 2014 –  : Cornell Fleischer
 11 June 2014 –  : Feridun Hamdullahpur
 11 June 2014 –  : György Hazai
 11 June 2014 –  : Machiel Kiel
 11 June 2014 –  : Fehim Nametak
 11 June 2014 –  : Dimitri Mihailoviç Nasilov
 11 June 2014 –  : Julian Raby
 11 June 2014 –  : Claudia Römer
 11 June 2014 –  : Tadashi Suzuki
 11 June 2014 –  : Abdeljelil Temimi
 11 June 2014 –  : Abudurexıti Yakufu
 11 June 2014 –  : Feroz Ahmad

References

Orders, decorations, and medals of Turkey
Civil awards and decorations of Turkey
Awards established in 1988
Orders of merit